Manuel Bañuelos (born March 13, 1991) is a Mexican professional baseball pitcher for the Tohoku Rakuten Golden Eagles of Nippon Professional Baseball (NPB). He has previously played in MLB for the Atlanta Braves, Chicago White Sox, New York Yankees and Pittsburgh Pirates, and in the Chinese Professional Baseball League (CPBL) for the Fubon Guardians.

Career

New York Yankees
In 2008, the New York Yankees signed four players, including Bañuelos and Alfredo Aceves, from the Mexican League for $450,000. Bañuelos participated in the All-Star Futures Game in 2009.

Bañuelos missed some time during the 2010 season with an appendectomy. In 2010, Bañuelos split time between the Class-A Advanced Tampa Yankees and the Class-AA Trenton Thunder. Bañuelos played in the Arizona Fall League after the 2010 season, earning the start in the team's all-star game.

Before the 2010 season, he was rated as the Yankees sixth best prospect according to Baseball America, and in 2011 he was rated as the fourth best. He was also one of the top 50 overall prospects according to MLB.com.

In 2011, Bañuelos was invited to spring training with the Yankees for the first time. Mariano Rivera said that he believed Bañuelos was the best pitching prospect he had seen. He won the James P. Dawson Award, given annually to the best rookie in camp. He began the 2011 season with Trenton was promoted to the Scranton/Wilkes-Barre Yankees of the Triple-A International League on August 2.

Bañuelos was again invited to spring training in 2012. After struggling through injuries during the 2012 season, Bañuelos underwent Tommy John surgery, and missed the entire 2013 season. He returned to pitch for Scranton/Wilkes-Barre in 2014.

Atlanta Braves
On January 1, 2015, the Yankees traded Bañuelos to the Atlanta Braves for pitchers David Carpenter and Chasen Shreve. He was invited to spring training, and assigned to the Gwinnett Braves of the International League on March 27.

The Braves promoted Bañuelos to the major leagues on July 2, 2015. In his debut that day, he pitched  innings and recorded seven strikeouts and no earned runs against the Washington Nationals. He ended the outing by hitting Denard Span and Danny Espinosa and was removed from the game due to cramping and dehydration. Later that month, tests revealed that Bañuelos had a bone spur. He was sent to the minors for rest and rehabilitation, before a second callup in September. The bone spur continued to bother him, and Bañuelos underwent surgery to remove it on September 17.

In 2016, Bañuelos contended for a spot in the rotation in spring training. However, on March 22, he began to feel discomfort in his pitching elbow and underwent an MRI that uncovered no irregularities. The team placed Bañuelos in extended spring training until May, when he was cleared to join Gwinnett after a one-game rehab assignment with the low A Rome Braves. On May 23, 2016, he was optioned to Gwinnett. The Braves demoted him to the Mississippi Braves of the Double-A Southern League. Bañuelos was designated for assignment on August 12.

Los Angeles Angels of Anaheim
On August 21, 2016, Bañuelos signed a minor league contract with the Los Angeles Angels of Anaheim. In 2017, he pitched for the Salt Lake Bees of the Triple-A Pacific Coast League (PCL). He elected free agency on November 6, 2017.

Los Angeles Dodgers
On November 17, 2017, Bañuelos signed a minor league contract with the Los Angeles Dodgers. He was assigned to the Oklahoma City Dodgers of the PCL for the 2018 season and was selected to represent the PCL at the Triple-A All-Star Game and was also selected to the post-season PCL All-Star Team. He made 31 appearances, with 18 starts and posted a 3.73 ERA with nine wins and seven losses.

Chicago White Sox
On November 1, 2018, the Dodgers traded Bañuelos to the Chicago White Sox in exchange for minor league infielder Justin Yurchak. The White Sox added him to the 40 man roster. The White Sox promoted him to the major leagues as a long reliever and spot starter. He gave up nine runs, all of them earned, to the Boston Red Sox in a single inning during a home game on May 4, 2019, exiting the game with a 30.34 ERA. On October 28, the White Sox outrighted Bañuelos off of the roster. He elected free agency following the season.

Seattle Mariners
On February 2, 2020, Bañuelos signed a minor league deal with the Seattle Mariners. Bañuelos was released by the Mariners organization on May 28, 2020.

Fubon Guardians
On June 18, 2020, Bañuelos signed with the Fubon Guardians of the Chinese Professional Baseball League. He posted a 6–3 record, 2.60 ERA, and 62 strikeouts across 9 starts in his first season with the club. On December 17, 2020, Bañuelos re-signed with the Guardians for the 2021 season. He was released on July 5, 2021, in order to play with Team Mexico at the 2020 Summer Olympics (contested in 2021). He finished the 2021 season with a 2.94 ERA and 1.33 WHIP over 49 innings pitched.

Sultanes de Monterrey
On July 13, 2021, Bañuelos signed with the Sultanes de Monterrey of the Mexican League.

New York Yankees (second stint)
On January 10, 2022, Bañuelos signed a minor league contract with the New York Yankees organization. He began the 2022 season with the Scranton/Wilkes-Barre RailRiders, and had a 2.35 ERA through  innings. The Yankees promoted him to the major leagues on May 26.

Bañuelos pitched in four games for the Yankees, recording a 2.16 ERA. The Yankees designated him for assignment on June 28 to make room on the active roster for JP Sears.

Pittsburgh Pirates
The Yankees traded Bañuelos to the Pittsburgh Pirates for cash considerations on July 3, 2022. On November 18, he was non tendered and became a free agent.

Tohoku Rakuten Golden Eagles
On December 8, 2022, Bañuelos signed with the Tohoku Rakuten Golden Eagles of Nippon Professional Baseball.

References

External links

1991 births
Living people
Arizona League White Sox players
Atlanta Braves players
Baseball players at the 2020 Summer Olympics
Baseball players from Durango
Charleston RiverDogs players
Charlotte Knights players
Chicago White Sox players
Fubon Guardians players
Gulf Coast Braves players
Gulf Coast Yankees players
Gwinnett Braves players
Major League Baseball pitchers
Major League Baseball players from Mexico
Mexican expatriate baseball players in the United States
Mississippi Braves players
New York Yankees players
Oklahoma City Dodgers players
Olympic baseball players of Mexico
People from Gómez Palacio, Durango
Phoenix Desert Dogs players
Pittsburgh Pirates players
Rome Braves players
Salt Lake Bees players
Scranton/Wilkes-Barre Yankees players
Sportspeople from Durango
Tampa Yankees players
Tomateros de Culiacán players
Trenton Thunder players
Winston-Salem Dash players